Wang Feng-hsin, sometimes spelled Wang Fong-jin, is a Taiwanese baseball pitcher who is currently a free agent. In 2010, Feng-hsin went 7–4 with a 2.60 ERA over 100⅓ innings of work, after spending most of the previous two seasons on the bench. He was awarded the CPBL Most Improved Player of the Year award following his 2010 performance.

References

Living people
Baseball players from Tainan
La New Bears players
Lamigo Monkeys players
Year of birth missing (living people)